"A Change Is Gonna Come" is the fourth season premiere of the American television medical drama Grey's Anatomy, and the 62nd episode of the overall series. The premiere focused on the aftermath of the main characters' promotion to residency, following the conclusion of their internship. The episode was the first not to feature Isaiah Washington, portraying Preston Burke, due to his being fired from the series at the conclusion of season 3. The episode also marked Chyler Leigh's promotion to series regular status, following her guest appearances in the last 2 episodes of the previous season. Also featured were one-time guest actors Mark Pellegrino, Stephania Childers, Sandra Thigpen, and Steven Porter.

The story arcs which provided a particular focus on individual characters include Cristina Yang (Sandra Oh) dealing with the aftermath of Burke's (Washington) departure, and the dissolution of their engagement, Izzie Stevens (Katherine Heigl) struggling with her romantic feelings towards the married George O'Malley   (T. R. Knight), and Callie Torres (Sara Ramirez) learning to deal with her new position of Chief Resident. Also dealt with was Alex Karev (Justin Chambers) coping with Rebecca Pope's (Elizabeth Reaser) departure, and Meredith Grey (Ellen Pompeo) facing the conclusion of her relationship with Derek Shepherd     (Patrick Dempsey), while dealing with the arrival of her half-sister, Lexie Grey (Leigh), who enrolls in the surgical program at the hospital.

The script for the premiere was written by series creator Shonda Rhimes, while Rob Corn served as the director. The episode aired on September 27, 2007 in the United States on the American Broadcasting Company (ABC), with an approximated 20.93 million viewers tuning in. Ranking #2 in the time-slot and #3 for the week, the episode garnered a 7.3 Nielsen rating in the 18–49 demographic, seeing a decrease from the previous episode, which received an 8.0 rating. Critical response of the episode ranged from mixed to negative, with Yang's storyline being a particular source of critical acclaim from television reviewers. Although the episode was fictionally set in Seattle, Washington, filming occurred in Los Angeles, California.

Plot 

The episode opens to a voice-over narrative from Meredith Grey (Ellen Pompeo) about change, the episode's main theme. Following the conclusion of their internship, Meredith, along with her colleagues, Cristina Yang (Sandra Oh), Izzie Stevens (Katherine Heigl), and Alex Karev (Justin Chambers) commence their residency in the department of surgery, and start dealing with new responsibilities, including the new generation of interns, to whom they have been assigned as mentors. After failing his post-internship exam in the season three finale, George O'Malley (T. R. Knight) must repeat his internship year, to avoid being forced to leave the medical field. It is revealed that among the new interns is Lexie Grey (Chyler Leigh), Meredith's half-sister, who previously had an encounter with Derek Shepherd (Patrick Dempsey), despite his unawareness of her identity. Callie Torres (Sara Ramirez), whom Richard Webber (James Pickens, Jr.) chose for Miranda Bailey's (Chandra Wilson) righteous position of Chief Resident, finds difficulty in exposing an authoritative behavior, receiving little respect from her subordinates.

It is explained that, in the aftermath of her being left by Preston Burke (Isaiah Washington) at the altar, Yang spent her honeymoon travelling with Meredith. Having just returned, she is shocked to learn that Burke has resigned from Seattle Grace, and relocated to an unknown location. She cried in response. Stevens has to deal with her romantic feelings for O'Malley, whose marriage to Torres is being threatened by his yet to be exposed affair. O'Malley, who finds himself in the unpleasant situation of repeating his internship, quickly gains support in Lexie, who decides not to tell the fellow interns about his failed exam. Karev is revealed to have visited Rebecca Pope (Elizabeth Reaser), following her departure. In the absence of Addison Montgomery (Kate Walsh), who relocated to Los Angeles, California, Mark Sloan (Eric Dane) seeks reconciliation with Shepherd, formerly his closest friend and confidant. Initially unwilling to resume his friendship with Sloan, Shepherd ultimately gives him a second chance. Bailey manifests a cold attitude towards Webber, in order to express her disappointment in not being given the position of Chief Resident, in spite of her enviable reputation among the hospital staff. Lexie meets Meredith for the first time, but is demoralized when she becomes aware of her apparent discomfort. Meredith and Shepherd encounter difficulty in being broken up, realizing that their mutual romantic feelings are an impediment in their attempt at having separate lives.

The emergency room is filled with victims from a chain car accident, one of whom is admitted in the department of neurosurgery, under the care of Shepherd and Yang. As the physicians soon discover that he has been internally decapitated, they come to the conclusion that even a minor move would result in irreparable damage. A pregnant woman is admitted in plastic surgery, after having her arm severed. Meredith is assigned to work for Sloan during the day, and is immediately told to find the arm, much to the fascination of her interns. Despite trying to deal with her trainees in a strict manner, Stevens is looked upon as unprofessional by the interns she was assigned to. Her image is further deteriorated when she decides to abandon her hospital duties, in order to perform surgery on a deer, once again letting her emotional involvement interfere with her career. Meredith and Shepherd discuss the repercussions of their breakup, and realize that they cannot reconcile. However, the two engage in sexual intercourse, as a manner to express their mutual feelings for the last time. O'Malley comes to the realization of his love for Stevens, and quickly discloses to her that he shares her romantic feelings.

Production 

"A Change Is Gonna Come" was written by series creator and executive producer Shonda Rhimes, whereas filmmaker and series veteran Rob Corn served as the director. The soundtrack used in the episode included Mat Kearney's "Breathe In, Breathe Out", I'm from Barcelona's "Oversleeping", Meiko's "Reasons to Love You" and Cinematic Orchestra's "To Build A Home". Also featured in the episode was "Knock 'Em Out", the second track from British pop singer-songwriter Lily Allen's debut album, Alright, Still. Several one-time guest stars appeared in the episode, including Mark Pellegrino, who played Chris, Stephania Childers, portraying Nancy Walters, Sandra Thigpen in the role of Clara, and Steven Porter, who acted as Joey. Although fictionally set in Seattle, Washington, filming primarily occurred in Los Angeles, California. Scenes in the operating room were filmed at the Prospect Studios in Los Feliz, Los Angeles.

The season 4 premiere saw Leigh's first appearance as a main cast member. Leigh first appeared on the show during the last 3 episodes of season 3 as Meredith's half-sister, Lexie. Following Washington's departure, it was reported that show's executives were planning on adding new cast members, such as Lexie. She was officially upgraded to a series' regular on July 11, 2007, for season 4. On casting Leigh as Lexie, Grey's Anatomy creator Shonda Rhimes stated, "We met with a lot of young actresses, but Chyler stood out. She had a quality that felt right and real to me. It felt like she could be Meredith's sister, but she had a depth that was very interesting." Leigh offered her insight on her first days working with the main cast of the series, "It was like coming into somebody else's group or circle. It was a little daunting in the beginning. But I have had such a great time." Also introduced in "A Change Is Gonna Come" is the new generation of interns, all of whom were portrayed in co-star capacity, with the exception of Lexie.

"A Change Is Gonna Come" was the first episode in 2 years not to feature the character of Montgomery, due to her portrayer, Walsh, leaving the series in order to launch the Grey's Anatomy spin-off, medical drama Private Practice. However, the character continued to be prominent throughout the run of the series, appearing sporadically as a guest-star in the following seasons.

"A Change Is Gonna Come" was the first episode not to feature Washington's character, Burke. Washington was officially fired from the series, following an on-set incident with Knight and Dempsey, which had been in the media attention since the commencement of the production for the third season. News reports surfaced that Washington had insulted co-star Knight with a homophobic slur. Following the exposure of the argument, Knight publicly disclosed his homosexuality, which led to Washington's issuing an apology statement, regarding his inappropriate use of words during the incident. The controversy later resurfaced when the cast appeared at the 65th Golden Globe Awards ceremony, which saw Washington ridiculing homosexuality during an interview, following the statement that denied the occurrence of an on-set incident. After being rebuked by his studio, Touchstone Television, Washington publicly apologized at length for using the epithet in reference to Knight. An issue of People disclosed Washington's presence at executive counseling, which led to an undetermined hiatus of his contract. After "Didn't We Almost Have It All?", the last episode Washington appeared in, was filmed, the network decided not to give Washington the possibility of a renewal. In a statement released by his publicist, Washington assessed, "I'm mad as hell and I'm not going to take it anymore". In another report, Washington stated he was planning to spend the summer pursuing charity work in Sierra Leone, while working on an independent film. In a subsequent interview, Washington highlighted the unfairness in his being let go from the series, considering filing a lawsuit as a result. He also accused Knight of using the controversy to bolster his own career and increase his salary on the series. Following his firing, Washington began asserting that racism within the broadcasting media was a primary factor in his dismissal from the series, which drew a critical perspective from Rhimes. During his appearance on Larry King Live, Washington once again denied using a homophobic epithet in reference to Knight.

While writing the episode, Rhimes put an emphasis on the character of O'Malley, detailing his relationships with both Stevens and Torres. On the topic, Rhimes elaborated, "The interns are residents now, with interns of their own. Except for George, poor George, who is stuck repeating his intern year. It's not easy being a repeater. He's the only who hasn't gone through any change when we begin the episode. But by the end, he has. He tells Izzie that he loves her too. Which takes guts. Because he knows what he is getting into. He's a married man with a great wife, and he never intended to be a married man who loved another woman." Regarding Meredith's story arc, Rhimes felt that she cannot deal with all that is expected of her in her relationship with Shepherd, choosing their genuine love as the greatest obstacle in their decision to break up.  Writing for Yang's storyline, Rhimes focused on her unsuccessful attempts at moving on, exposing her devastation at the realization of Burke's departure, which would be the main seasonal storyline for the character.

The episode also deals with Sloan and Shepherd's path to reconciliation. Rhimes disclosed that the concept for the plot point was to have the two characters go back to being friends, as a result of Montgomery's departure. Rhimes offered her insight on Lexie's arrival, "Lexie Grey is here now. And she's here to stay. I love that she's a bit of a dork. Being a dork myself, I am fond of the girls with verbal diarrhea. Because it's not easy to keep all your words in, believe me." Regarding Webber and Bailey's storyline, Rhimes noted that the latter's intentions are not to let the former "off the hook" for choosing Torres over her for the position of Chief Resident, which was righteously hers. Rhimes highlighted the unfairness in Webber's choice, noting his unusual manner of comprehending the situation. "She's Bailey. She's worked hard, she's been the best. And isn't it just like the Chief to decide what is best for her? It's his flaw, the Chief. He's an old school man and like an old school man, he's taking care of his women. Whether they like it or not. This isn't gonna be an easy pill for Bailey to swallow."

Reception 

"A Change Is Gonna Come" was originally broadcast in the United States on September 27, 2007, airing on the American Broadcasting Company (ABC) in its regular 9:00 Eastern time-slot. Viewed by a total of 20.93 million viewers, the episode is the series' second most-watched season premiere, just behind the third season opener, which had been watched live by 25.41 million American viewers. In comparison to the previous episode, which was watched by 22.57 million viewers, "A Change Is Gonna Come" made a 21% decrease in terms of viewership. However, the viewership of the episode ranked second in both its time-slot and the entire night, being beaten out by its airtime rival, CSI: Crime Scene Investigation on CBS, which was watched by 25.22 million viewers. In the entire week, the episode ranked third, being beaten out by both CSI and fellow ABC show Dancing With the Stars. In addition to being a success in viewership, the episode also did well in ratings. "A Change Is Gonna Come" garnered a 7.3 Nielsen rating in household viewership, ranking second in its time-slot, and third for the week.

The premiere generally received mixed to negative feedback from television critics. Debbie Chang on BuddyTV deemed the episode "dysfunctional and ridiculous", being particularly critical of the story arc involving Stevens, whom she described as not being worthy of being promoted to the residency level. Chang expressed disagreement with the manner Bailey and Shepherd's characters were dealt with by the writers, feeling that the former's anger should have been targeted at herself, and criticizing the exaggerated exposure of the latter's "first grader emotional maturity". However, Yang's character was praised, with Chang choosing her manner of repressing her feelings as a highlight. Chang expressed a general disappointment in the episode, disapproving the choice for the episode as a season opener, a topic in regard to which she elaborated, "I  can see already that this season will continue to bring us medical cases that are so blatantly about the doctors' pathetic lives." In September 2009, the inclusion of the deer ranked #12 in Entertainment Weekly "Most Memorable Cases of Grey's Anatomy".

Eileen Lulevitch, entertainment reviewer for TV Guide, was generally favorable of the episode, writing, "Watching the season premiere tonight was like welcoming an old friend back into your home. It was so easy to slip back into Grey's world and get caught up in all of the amazing moments that make this show so much fun to watch. And while I expected the night to start off on a somber note, by addressing Burke and Cristina's fallout, I was pleasantly surprised by the way the attendees paid tribute to Bailey, by giving their new interns the same exact first-day speech Bailey had given them." Lulevitch praised Meredith's story-arc, noting the surprising turn her character evolution has taken, as she praised Lexie's introduction. While expressing a negative perspective on the writers' decision to have Torres be the Chief Resident, instead of Bailey, Lulevitch described Torres' adjustment to her new position as one of the episode's focal points. Despite praising Yang's storyline in the personal background, the concept of her interaction with the patient she was assigned to was regarded as predictable and obvious, "When the man's family came to see him, and Cristina told them it could be for the very last time. It was that moment that really got Cristina thinking about how much she did in fact miss Burke, as we later learned in the episode." Writing for IGN, Laura Burrows was favorable of the episode. Regarding the storylines developed in "A Change Is Gonna Come", Burrows elaborated, "The season opener was promising in that it had the interns in a new role and introduced a new side of George. As all of his friends progressed from interns to residents, George was forced to re-sit his internship. This created new drama and also opened up the hospital to a whole new set of interns rife with their own set of emotional baggage and drama. There were a series of interesting and new plots."

Heigl, who portrayed Stevens, was particularly critical of her character's relationship with O'Malley, deeming it "a ratings ploy". Heigl further explained her outlook on the progression of her character, "They really hurt somebody, and they didn't seem to be taking a lot of responsibility for it. I have a really hard time with that kind of thing. I'm maybe a little too black and white about it. I don't really know Izzie very well right now." Former The Star-Ledger columnist Alan Sepinwall expressed a negative perspective on the episode, deeming it childish and ridiculous. He disliked Rhimes' conception of the story arc involving Stevens, elaborating, "If there's a doctor on this show who should be forced to repeat their intern year, if only to prevent them from being allowed to influence younger doctors, it's Izzie, not George. She proves her unfitness for this role with her first patient of the day, the deer. Not cute, not character-illuminating, just dumb." Also criticized was Torres, whose regression from a "cool, rocking, outgoing, confident and full-of-life" role was highlighted, receiving negative feedback from Sepinwall, who wrote "Now the character exists entirely so the writers can dump on her, in a devolution far worse than anything. I just don't get it, and it pains me to watch any scene with Callie in it. Despite expressing a negative outlook on Meredith's story-arc which dealt with Shepherd, noting that the "constant break-ups and reunions are as silly as if Shonda Rhimes had just kept them apart for 3 seasons before letting them kiss", Sepinwall was favorable of Lexie's arrival at Seattle Grace, feeling that "she's still being written as Meredith circa season 1 in an attempt to make us like her, but I didn't mind the manipulation, if only because there are so few characters left on this show to like." The Buzzsugar television reviewer was mainly critical of the episode, describing it as a departure from "the old show". However, Lexie's introduction was praised in the Buzzsugar review.

References

External links
 

2007 American television episodes
Grey's Anatomy (season 4) episodes